Jens Pohlmann  (born 30 October 1978) is a German male water polo player. He was a member of the Germany men's national water polo team, playing as a driver. He was a part of the  team at the 2004 Summer Olympics. On club level he played for Wasserfreunde Spandau 04 in Germany.

References

1978 births
Living people
German male water polo players
Water polo players at the 2004 Summer Olympics
Olympic water polo players of Germany
Water polo players from Berlin